Dwikora Harbour (Indonesian: Pelabuhan Dwikora) is the main harbour of Pontianak. It is located at the edge of Kapuas River in Pontianak central area. Its location is also near to Pontianak Mayor Office.

Pontianak